The Treaty of Big Tree was a formal treaty signed in 1797 between the Seneca Nation and the United States, in which the Seneca relinquished their rights to nearly all of their traditional homeland in New York State—nearly 3.5 million acres. In the 1788 Phelps and Gorham Purchase, the Haudenosaunee (Iroquois) had previously sold rights to their land between Seneca Lake and the Genesee River. The Treaty of Big Tree signed away their rights to all their territory west of the Genesee River except 12 small tracts of land for $100,000 and other considerations (roughly $5 billion in 2020 dollars, in relation to GDP). The money was not paid directly to the tribe, but was to be invested in shares of the Bank of the United States, and to be paid out to the Senecas in annual earnings of up to six percent, or $6,000 a year, on the bank stock.

History
The delegates for both parties met from August 20, 1797 until September 16, 1797 at the rustic cabin of James and William Wadsworth, early settlers and land agents in the area, in what is now Geneseo, New York. The council took place near the Wadsworths' cabin, just west of the current campus of SUNY Geneseo.

In attendance were nearly 3000 Seneca and other prominent members of the Six Nations of the Iroquois. Representing them were their hoyaneh chiefs: Cornplanter, Red Jacket, Young King, Little Billy, Farmer's Brother, Handsome Lake, Tall Chief, Little Beard and others; the clan mothers of the nation; and Mary Jemison. Those in attendance representing the United States were: Colonel Jeremiah Wadsworth, Commissioner, who was assigned by President George Washington to represent the United States government; Captain Charles Williamson and Thomas Morris, representing his father; Robert Morris; General William Shepard, representing Massachusetts; William Bayard, representing New York;  Captain Israel Chapin, representing the Department of Indian Affairs; and James Rees as acting secretary. The official interpreters were Horatio Jones and Jasper Parrish.  Also in attendance were representatives of the Holland Land Company including William Bayard, Joseph Ellicott (surveyor), John Lincklaen, Gerrit Boon, Jan Gabriel van Staphorst and Roelof Van Staphorst.

According to accounts, all of the treaty delegates for the United States were housed in the Wadsworths' log cabin. A council house was erected nearby by the Seneca, and proceedings were held there. The treaty was signed on September 16, 1797, after nearly a month of often heated back-and-forth negotiations. Following negotiations, Robert Morris requested the $100,000 principal revert to his heirs if “the Seneca nation” should ever “become extinct.” The presiding secretaries of Treasury and State denied his request. This treaty is substantial as it opened up the rest of the territory west of the Genesee River for settlement and established twelve reservations, perpetual annuities and hunting and fishing rights for the Seneca in Western New York.

Namesake 
The treaty was signed near the present-day village of Geneseo, New York. At the time of the treaty's signing, this area was known as Big Tree because of the nearby Seneca village of Big Tree, just over the Genesee River in present-day Leicester. The village was likely named after Ga-on-dah-go-waah’or Karontowanen, a chief referred to by the title Big Tree, roughly translating to "tree-prone-big" or "great tree, lying down."  

Local lore has conflated the name of the chief and village of Big Tree with the famous "Big Tree" or "Wadsworth Oak," which grew on the eastern bank of the Genesee River in Geneseo. The tree was noted for its immense circumference and was the subject of several paintings. While the treaty was signed not far from the large oak, the idea of a tree lying prostrate, as suggested by the Seneca name, does not describe the oak as it stood during the events of 1797. Following the signing of the treaty, the Big Tree became a popular sightseeing destination for white settlers. 

The Big Tree was washed from the banks of the river in late 1857 as the result of a flood. Earlier that year, the trunk of the tree had been measured as having a circumference of 26 feet and 9 inches. The Livingston County Historical Society Museum in Geneseo, New York, houses a restored section of the Big Tree, which is believed to be the last remaining remnant, other than several pieces of furniture created by a 19th-century woodworker.

Seneca Nation reservations
The following reservations were guaranteed by the treaty:
 Along the Genesee River, the former Seneca heartland

 

 

 

 

 

 

 Western New York

 

 

 

 

The treaty left the exact location and sizes of the Buffalo Creek and Tonawanda Creek reservations undefined. In October, 1798, Augustus Porter, acting on behalf of Joseph Ellicott and the Holland Land Company, conducted a survey of the area. In the course of the survey he caused the northwest corner of the tract to be bent so that the mouth of Buffalo Creek would be outside the reservation.

Absent from the treaty was the Oil Spring Reservation near Cuba Lake. In 1861, the Senecas won a lawsuit granting the Seneca Nation of Indians sovereignty over the reservation under the premise that the omission of Oil Spring was a mistake.

See also
 Treaty of Fort Stanwix (1784)
 Treaty of Canandaigua
 Treaties of Buffalo Creek
 Six Nations land cessions

References

Sources

"Red Jacket; Iroquois Diplomat and Orator", by Christopher Densmore, Syracuse University Press, 1999
"Robert Morris and the Treaty of Big Tree", by Norman B. Wilkinson, Organization of American Historians, 1953
"The Wadsworths of the Genesee", by Alden Hatch, Goward-McCann, Inc., New York  1959
Laurence M. Hauptman, Conspiracy of Interests: Iroquois Dispossession and the Rise of New York State (2001).

External links
 Scan of the original Treaty of Big Tree from the National Archives 
 1804 map of the Holland Land Company purchase showing reservations deeded by the Treaty of Big Tree

Big Tree
1797 treaties
Aboriginal title in New York
1797 in New York (state)
1797 in the United States